The 2014 Girabola was the 36th season of top-tier football league in Angola. The season ran from 21 February to 8 November 2014. Kabuscorp were the defending champions, having won their first Angolan championship in 2013.

The league comprised 16 teams, the bottom three of which were relegated to the 2015 Segundona.

Teams
A total of 16 teams contested the league, including 13 sides from the 2013 season and three promoted from the 2013 Segundona, Benfica do Lubango, Sporting de Cabinda, União SC do Uíge.
On the other hand, Porcelana FC, Atlético do Namibe, Santos FC were the last three teams of the 2013 season and played in the Segundona for the 2014 season. Kabuscorp were the defending champions from the 2013 season.

Stadiums and locations

Changes from 2013 season
Relegated: Atlético do Namibe, Porcelana FC, Santos FC 
Promoted: Benfica do Lubango, Sporting de Cabinda, 
Progresso do Sambizanga

League table

Results

Season statistics

Top scorers

Hat-tricks

See also
 2014 Segundona
 List of Girabola players during 2014 season

References

External links
Girabola 2014 stats at jornaldosdesportos.sapo.ao
Federação Angolana de Futebol

Girabola seasons
1
Angola
Angola